Corneliu Calotescu (November 19, 1889 – October 17, 1970) was a Romanian major-general during World War II.

He was born in Pitești, the son of Constantin and Felicia Calotescu. Following into his father footsteps, he chose to go into a military career and enrolled in 1908 in the Bucharest Military School. He graduated in 1910 with the rank of second lieutenant and joined the 30th Dorobanți Muscel Regiment. After Romania entered World War I in August 1916 on the side of the Allies, Calotescu, by then a captain, fought at the Battle of Mărăști in the summer of 1917, and was subsequently decorated with the Order of Michael the Brave, Third Class.

Calotescu advanced in rank to lieutenant colonel in 1927 and colonel in 1934. From 1934 to 1934 he commanded the 4th Dorobanți Argeș Infantry Regiment, and in October 1939 he was promoted to brigadier general. He served as Secretary-General to the Under-Secretary of State of Land Forces in 1940. In June 1940 he was awarder the Order of the Crown, Commander class. 

From 30 August 1941, he was Deputy Governor-General of Bukovina, and then Governor-General of Bukovina; he served in this position from 5 September 1941 to 20 March 1943. At the urging of military dictator Ion Antonescu, Calotescu  announced on October 10, 1941 his decision that all the Jews of Cernăuți must be deported to Transnistria. After Traian Popovici, the Mayor of Cernăuți, intervened, Calotescu agreed that Popovici would be allowed to nominate 200 Jews who were to be exempted from deportation; the number grew to 20,000 after Popovici appealed directly to Antonescu.

After being promoted to major general on 25 October 1942, Calotescu took command of the 3rd Infantry Division on 21 March 1943. After the coup d'état of 23 August 1944, he was named commander of the 2nd Vânători de munte Division, with which he fought in Transylvania until October 12, 1944, when he went into the reserves.

On 22 March 1945, Calotescu was put into retirement by the Petru Groza government. In May 1945 he was tried by the Bucharest People's Tribunal; found guilty of crimes perpetrated during the 1941 Odessa massacre, he was condemned to death. Later that year his sentence was commuted to life imprisonment, and he was sent to Aiud Prison. In June 1956 he was pardoned and released. He returned to Pitești, where he died in 1970.

Publications

External links

References

1889 births
1970 deaths
People from Pitești
Romanian military personnel of World War I
Romanian military personnel of World War II
Romanian Land Forces generals 	
Holocaust perpetrators in Romania
Romanian people convicted of war crimes
Romanian prisoners and detainees
Inmates of Aiud prison
People detained by the Securitate
Recipients of the Order of Michael the Brave
Commanders of the Order of the Crown (Romania)